Electric Light Orchestra Live is a live album by Electric Light Orchestra. It was released on 19 April 2013 in the UK, and on 23 April in the US on Frontiers Records.

Overview
The album consists of performances from their 2001 Zoom Tour Live PBS taping at CBS Television City in Los Angeles, along with two previously unreleased studio tracks. While all the songs on this CD were making their official audio debut, "Secret Messages", "Sweet Talkin' Woman", "Twilight" and "Confusion" were especially unique as they didn't even appear on the Zoom Tour Live DVD.

Two additional live tracks from the same performances, "Turn to Stone" and "Do Ya", were released as bonus tracks on various editions of their Zoom album reissue, which coincided with the release of Electric Light Orchestra Live, while the track "Twilight" has been previously released as a Japanese bonus track on Mr. Blue Sky: The Very Best of Electric Light Orchestra

Track listing
All tracks are written by Jeff Lynne, with the exception of Roll Over Beethoven by Chuck Berry.

Bonus tracks

Additional Japanese bonus track

Personnel
 Jeff Lynne – lead vocals, lead guitar, rhythm guitar
 Richard Tandy – keyboards, synthesizer, vocoder
 Marc Mann – lead guitar, rhythm guitar, keyboards, backing vocals
 Matt Bissonette – bass guitar, backing vocals
 Gregg Bissonette – drums, backing vocals
 Peggy Baldwin – electric cello
 Sarah O'Brien – electric cello
 Rosie Vela – backing vocals

References

Electric Light Orchestra live albums
Frontiers Records live albums
Albums produced by Jeff Lynne
2013 live albums